= Kala Pipal =

- village
- Location within Madhya Pradesh Location within India
- Coordinates: 23.3925931°N 77.4329048°E
- Country: India
- State: Madhya Pradesh
- District: Bhopal
- Tehsil: Huzur
- Elevation: 470 m (1,540 ft)

Population (2011)
  - Total: 288
- Time zone: UTC+5:30 (IST)
- ISO 3166 code: MP-IN
- 2011 census code: 482408

Kala Pipal is a village in the Bhopal district of Madhya Pradesh, India. It is located in the Huzur tehsil and the Phanda block.

== Demographics ==
According to the 2011 census of India, Kala Pipal has 60 households. The effective literacy rate (i.e. the literacy rate of population excluding children aged 6 and below) is 65.53%.

Demographics (2011 Census)
	Total	Male	Female
Population	288	155	133
Children aged below 6 years	53	28	25
Scheduled caste	70	38	32
Scheduled tribe	23	12	11
Literates	154	94	60
Workers (all)	137	81	56
Main workers (total)	132	80	52
Main workers: Cultivators	40	26	14
Main workers: Agricultural labourers	85	47	38
Main workers: Household industry workers	0	0	0
Main workers: Other	7	7	0
Marginal workers (total)	5	1	4
Marginal workers: Cultivators	0	0	0
Marginal workers: Agricultural labourers	3	1	2
Marginal workers: Household industry workers	1	0	1
Marginal workers: Others	1	0	1
Non-workers	151	74	77
